The '1999–2000 Kazakhstan Hockey Championship was the eighth season of the Kazakhstan Hockey Championship, the top level of ice hockey in Kazakhstan. Nine teams participated in the league, and Torpedo Ust-Kamenogorsk won the championship.

First round

Final round

References
Kazakh Ice Hockey Federation

Kazakhstan Hockey Championship
Kazakhstan Hockey Championship seasons
Kaz